Guillermo Sucre Figarella (15 May 1933 – 22 July 2021), was a Venezuelan poet and literary critic born in Tumeremo in the state of Bolivar. He was also a member of the Sucre family like his uncle Jose Antonio Ramos Sucre and his older brothers General Juan Manuel Sucre Figarella, and Senator Leopoldo Sucre Figarella.

Literary critic and academic
He translated into Spanish the works of André Breton, Saint-John Perse, William Carlos Williams, and Wallace Stevens.

In 1957 he founded the literary journal Sardío and an associated literary group. He began teaching at the Universidad Central de Venezuela in that same year. From 1968 till 1975 he lived in the United States, where he lectured at the University of Pittsburgh and became a member of Pitt's Instituto Internacional de Literatura Iberoamericana. Upon his return to Venezuela he taught at the Universidad Simón Bolívar and became literary director of the publishing house Monte Ávila Editores.

He won the National Prize for Literature in 1976 for his essay La máscara, la transparencia.

Poetry
His poetic work has a singular place within Venezuelan literature. He was a poet of light, like the Bolivian Eduardo Mitre or the Mexican Homero Aridjis, and like them his poetry was inspired by the tropics.

Notable works
 Borges, el poeta (1967)
 La máscara, la transparencia (1975)
 Mientras suceden los días (1961)
 La mirada (1970)
 En el verano cada palabra respira en el verano (1976)
 Serpiente breve (1977) 
 La vastedad (1990)

References

 Balderston, Daniel, The Encyclopedia of Twentieth-Century Latin American and Caribbean Literature, 1900-2003, p. 553
 http://es.encarta.msn.com/encyclopedia_961532585/Guillermo_Sucre.html (Archived 2009-11-01)

People from Bolívar (state)
20th-century Venezuelan poets
Venezuelan essayists
Male essayists
Central University of Venezuela alumni
Academic staff of the Central University of Venezuela
Academic staff of Simón Bolívar University (Venezuela)
University of Pittsburgh faculty
1933 births
2021 deaths
Venezuelan male poets
20th-century essayists
20th-century male writers